Nemophas bennigseni is a species of beetle in the family Cerambycidae. It was described by Per Olof Christopher Aurivillius in 1908. It is known from Papua New Guinea.

References

bennigseni
Beetles described in 1908